Apostolos Dimopoulos (born 17 December 1974) is a retired Greek football defender.

References

1974 births
Living people
Greek footballers
Ethnikos Piraeus F.C. players
Ethnikos Asteras F.C. players
Agios Dimitrios F.C. players
Association football defenders
Super League Greece players